The Avion III (sometimes referred to as the Aquilon or the Éole III) was a  steam-powered  aircraft built by Clément Ader between 1892 and 1897, financed by the French War Office.

Retaining the same bat-like configuration of the Éole, the Avion III was equipped with two engines driving two propellers. While the earlier aircraft had no means of directional control at all, this one was equipped with a rudder.

Trials began at the Satory army base near Versailles on 12 October 1897, with the aircraft taxiing along a circular track. On 14 October 1897, it took off but turned halfway around and then stopped. Later in his life, Ader claimed that there had been a flight of 100 m (328 ft) on this day, and said he had two witnesses to confirm it. Regardless, the French military was unimpressed with the demonstration and cancelled any further funding.

The machine is preserved at the Musée des Arts et Métiers in Paris. It underwent extensive restoration in the 1980s.

Specifications (Avion III)

Gallery

See also

References

19th-century French experimental aircraft
Steam-powered aircraft
Gull-wing aircraft